Jelenin  is a village in the administrative district of Gmina Borów, within Strzelin County, Lower Silesian Voivodeship, in south-western Poland.

The name of the village is of Polish origin and comes from the word jeleń, which means "deer".

References

Jelenin